Holy Angels High
 School and Junior College, earlier known as St. Ann's English Medium School (also known as St. Ann's Convent School) is a school located on the outskirts of Lonand in Maharashtra, India on Pune- Satara Highway, Nimbodi-Padali Road.

This school is a Christian Religious Minority institution and the related certificate was issued in 2012 by the state Govt.

History
The fathers of the Missionary Congregation of the Blessed Sacrament (M.C.B.S) invited sisters of CMC Amala province Kanjirappally, to collaborate with them in the Satara–Solapur mission. Sensing the urgent need of an educational institution in the village, the then provincial council decided to start a school as their own in Lonand. The school started functioning with 26 students in K.G section in 1995 in a rented building owned by the Lonand panchayat. It started as co-educational institution with English as medium of instruction. The enrollment increased year by year and the school had to be shifted to spacious building. The province bought a plot of 4 acres of land on the Lonand –Nimbodi road and started construction of the school. A portion of the building was completed and blessed on 8 July 1997 by Rev. Fr. Thomas Thadathil, the mission superior of MCBS (Satara- Solapur) and the school shifted to the new site. In the year 2006, the first batch of 10th std passed out in flying colors.

In the year 2012, the school was raised to the status of a Junior College offering science stream. Now that the school has all the facilities of a Junior college such as laboratories, library, computer lab etc. the management procured another adjacent plot of land in 2007 and expanded the playground with basketball, volleyball and football courts. It stands as one of the prestigious institutions in Satara district.

Motto
"Wisdom, Love, Enlightenment."

True wisdom rests with God, who is Love, reaches man through enlightenment. All who seek God will find him in wisdom and will be enlightened and made able to enlighten others through loving service.

School life

Admissions
Admissions to all classes including KG begin in the month of May. However, new admissions are not taken to grades 9 and 10.

Activities

For polishing the academic skills co-curricular activities like speech competition, recitation competition, Arts exhibition, science exhibitions are organised for students. Sports week, cultural week, craft day are celebrated annually.

Students are also encouraged to become members of various clubs like Math club, Quiz club, Nature club, Speech club

Students also get a chance to be a part of Scouts and Guides, R.S.P.

Facilities
The classrooms are electronically equipped. Students get actively involved in studies through visualizing, listening and doing. Regular physical education classes and practice in volleyball, basketball, football kho-kho etc. are given to students. Games as well as track events are also given importance.

External links
 Official website
 General info in brief
 Annual Report of St. Ann's School 2013-14

Primary schools in India
High schools and secondary schools in Maharashtra
Christian schools in Maharashtra
Education in Satara district
Educational institutions established in 1995
1995 establishments in Maharashtra
Syro-Malabar Catholic Church
Catholic secondary schools in India